Tillari Dam may refer to following dams located close to each other:
 Tillari (Forebay) Dam, in Kolhapur district, Maharashtra state of India 
 Tillari (Main) Dam, in Kolhapur district, Maharashtra state of India